NA-243 Karachi Keamari-II is a constituency for the National Assembly of Pakistan. The Kiamari Town is represented by Constituency NA-239 of National Assembly of Pakistan. While PS-89 and PS-90 represents in Sindh Assembly.

Members of Parliament

Since 2018-2022: NA-248 Karachi West-I

Election 2002 

General elections were held on 10 Oct 2002. Hakim Qari Gul Rehman of Muttahida Majlis-e-Amal won by 22,164 votes.

Election 2008 

General elections were held on 18 Feb 2008. Abdul Qadir Patel of PPP won by 56,840 votes.

Election 2013 

General elections were held on 11 May 2013. Abdul Qadir Patel of Pakistan Peoples Party was defeated by Mohammad Salman Khan Baloch of Muttahida Qaumi Movement who won by 39,251 votes and became the member of National Assembly.

Election 2018 

General elections were held on 25 July 2018.

See also
NA-242 Karachi Keamari-I
NA-244 Karachi West-I

References

External links 
Election result's official website

NA-239
Karachi